Eldra is a 2003 British drama film directed by Timothy Lyn. It was selected as the British entry for the Best Foreign Language Film at the 75th Academy Awards, but it was not nominated.

Cast
 Iona Jones as Eldra
 Rhys Richards as Ernest
 Leisa Mereid as Edith

See also
 List of submissions to the 75th Academy Awards for Best Foreign Language Film
 List of British submissions for the Academy Award for Best Foreign Language Film

References

External links
 

2003 films
2003 drama films
British drama films
Welsh-language films
Films about Romani people
2000s British films